Delentz Pierre (born November 16, 2000) is a Haitian soccer player who plays as a defender for Real Salt Lake.

Career 
Pierre has been part of the Real Salt Lake academy setup since 2015, and appeared for their USL Championship side Real Monarchs in 2019.

From late 2019, Pierre has committed to playing college soccer at the University of Portland.

References

External links 
 Real Salt Lake Academy Profile 

2000 births
Living people
American soccer players
Haitian footballers
Haitian expatriate footballers
Association football defenders
Real Monarchs players
Portland Pilots men's soccer players
Real Salt Lake players
Soccer players from Florida
USL Championship players
Haiti under-20 international footballers
Homegrown Players (MLS)